The Hon. Sean Godley (born 17 November 1981) is an Irish-Australian writer and poet.

Sean Garech Godley was born in Cavan to The 3rd Baron Kilbracken and his second wife, Susan Heazlewood.  He grew up between the family's estate, Killegar House, near Carrigallen, County Leitrim, and Great Britain. Godley was educated at Bradfield College, gained a BA in Film Theory and Psychology (2004) from The University of Gloucestershire and an MA in Writing (2007) from NUI Galway.

He won the prize for the best Short Poem at Ireland's leading literary festival, the Listowel Writer's Week, in 2006 for his sonnet "Sitting Still". He also received the Leitrim Guardian Literary Award for his short story "Flying the Nest". He is currently working on his first novel.

References

External links
Biography
Sitting Still

1981 births
Living people
Irish poets
People from County Cavan
People from County Leitrim
Younger sons of barons